Defiance (Swedish: Trots) is a 1952 Swedish drama film directed by Gustaf Molander and starring Anders Henrikson,  Per Oscarsson, Harriet Andersson and Eva Dahlbeck. It was shot at the Råsunda Studios in Stockholm and on location in Solna. The film's sets were designed by the art director Nils Svenwall.

Synopsis
A teacher imposes harsh discipline on his unruly son and the pupils in his class.

Cast

 Anders Henrikson as Uno Thörner
 Per Oscarsson as 	Rolf Thörner
 Harriet Andersson as 	Siv aka Sivan
 Eva Dahlbeck as 	Teacher
 John Elfström as Siv's Father
 Marianne Löfgren as 	Lisa
 Hugo Björne as 	Pater de Blaye
 Hjördis Petterson as Erika, teacher 
 Stig Järrel as Principal
 Viveca Serlachius as 	Inga
 Jarl Kulle as	Jerka
 Christina Lundquist as Marianne
 Hans Lindgren as	Ove, Rolf's friend 
 Wiktor Andersson as 	Taxi driver 
 Renée Björling as 	Ove and Marianne's mother 
 Elsa Ebbesen as 	Neighbour 
 Björn Berglund as 	Teacher
 Ernst Brunman as Teacher 
 Göthe Grefbo as 	Young man
 Erna Groth as 	Dancing young woman
 Kaj Hjelm as 	Benke
 Ragnar Klange as 	Teacher
 Segol Mann as 	Teacher 
 Anders Nyström as School boy

References

Bibliography 
 Qvist, Per Olov & von Bagh, Peter. Guide to the Cinema of Sweden and Finland. Greenwood Publishing Group, 2000.

External links 
 

1952 films
Swedish drama films
1952 drama films
1950s Swedish-language films
Films directed by Gustaf Molander
Swedish black-and-white films
Films shot in Stockholm
Films based on Swedish novels
1950s Swedish films